Antiguraleus adcocki is a species of sea snail, a marine gastropod mollusk in the family Mangeliidae.

Description
The length of the shell attains 14 mm.

(Original description).This is an elegantly formed shell, with a very acute spire and moderately attenuated base. The ribs are numerous, thick and rounded, crossed by numerous rather faint spiral sulci.

G.B. Sowerby III proposed in 1896 the name  Mangilia adcocki as a nomen novum for the Mangilia bella of Adams and Angas (Proc. Zool. Soc. 1863, p. 419, pi. xxxvi, fig. 6), their name being preoccupied by Hinds. G.W. Tryon (Manual of Conchology, vol. vi, p. 270) considered it identical with Mangelia boakei , Nevill, a Ceylon shell with which from the figure and description, it seems to me to have but little affinity. Adcock's list gives as a synonym Mangilia gracilima, Tenison -Woods, but I have sought the records in vain for the name.

Charles Hedley stated in 1922 :"Sowerby changed the name of this species on the ground that Mangilia bella was preoccupied by Hinds, but as a matter of fact Mangilia was used for this species neither by Hinds nor by Adams and Angas, so that the innovation was not necessary. Tryon erred in ascribing this species to Ceylon." Hedley applied the name Guraleus bellus (Adams and Angas, 1863)

The Atlas of Living Australia considers Guraleus bellus a synonym of Marita bella (Adams & Angas, 1864)

Distribution
This marine species is endemic to Australia and occurs off New South Wales, South Australia, Tasmania and Victoria.

References

 Adams, A. & Angas, G.F. 1864. Descriptions of new species from Australian seas, in the collection of George French Angas. Proceedings of the Zoological Society of London 1863(III): 418-428, pl. xxxvii
 Verco, J.C. 1909. Notes on South Australian marine Mollusca with descriptions of new species. Part XII. Transactions of the Royal Society of South Australia 33: 293-342
 Hedley, C. 1922. A revision of the Australian Turridae. Records of the Australian Museum 13(6): 213-359, pls 42-56
 May, W.L. 1923. An Illustrated Index of Tasmanian Shells: with 47 plates and 1052 species. Hobart : Government Printer 100 pp.

External links
 
  Tucker, J.K. 2004 Catalog of recent and fossil turrids (Mollusca: Gastropoda). Zootaxa 682:1-1295.
 Petit, R. E. (2009). George Brettingham Sowerby, I, II & III: their conchological publications and molluscan taxa. Zootaxa. 2189: 1–218

adcocki
Gastropods described in 1896
Gastropods of Australia